The 2002–03 season was Cruz Azul's 74th season in existence and their 48th consecutive season in the top flight of Mexican football. The club participated in the Apertura and Clausura tournaments of the Mexican Primera División and in the 2003 Copa Libertadores.

Cruz Azul started the season under José Luis Trejo as manager, but he was sacked at the end of the Apertura tournament; club chairman Guillermo Álvarez cited the "lack of adequate results" as the main reason for firing Trejo. Mario Carrillo was chosen as Trejo's replacement. Trejo had managed to lead Cruz Azul into the playoffs, but were eliminated in quarterfinals by UNAM.

On 12 March 2003, in an unusual situation, chairman Guillermo Álvarez fired Mario Carrillo and the whole squad due to the bad results. Cruz Azul had not won a single match in the first nine rounds and had managed to get only six points; besides, the team had recently suffered a disgraceful 6–1 loss against Uruguayan club Fénix in the Copa Libertadores. After Álvarez terminated the entire first team squad contracts, the players were allowed to return but were given a new contract only for the remaining ten games; this new contract was subject to the team's results during the rest of the season. That same day, Enrique Meza was appointed manager of Cruz Azul.

Despite the mediocre season, Meza managed to lead the team into repechage, a playoff between Guadalajara and Cruz Azul; the winner would qualify to the championship playoffs. Despite winning the first leg 4–1, Cruz Azul lost 1–4 on the second leg and due to Guadalajara finishing ahead of Cruz Azul on the regular phase of the tournament, Cruz Azul was not able to enter the playoffs.

Internationally, Cruz Azul beat the Copa Pre Libertadores and classified to the 2003 Copa Libertadores group stage. Despite losing on its inaugural match against Corinthians 0–1 and the 1–6 loss against Fénix, Cruz Azul advanced to the knockout stage as second best team in the group.

Players

Apertura

Clausura

Transfers

In

Out

Competitions

Overview

Torneo Apertura

League table

Matches

Playoffs

Quarterfinals

Torneo Clausura

League table

Matches

Repechage

Copa Libertadores

Pre Pre Liberators 2002
The Pre Pre Libertadores 2002 is the last edition of the tournament which distributes the two tickets to the Mexican teams for the 2003 Copa Libertadores.
The tournament was won by Club Universidad Nacional by obtaining the first place of group with 6 points and thus obtained the place of Mexico 1, while cruz Azul achieved second place with 6 points by goal difference with which they managed to qualify as Mexico 2 to the Pre-Libertadores 2003 against Venezuelan clubs for two places to the Copa Libertadores 2003.

Group A 

More info on the games is here:Games

Second round 

More info on the games is here:Games

Pre Libertadores
From 1998 to 2002, Mexican and Venezuelan clubs played a mini tournament known as Copa Pre Libertadores to determine two teams that would qualify to the next year's Copa Libertadores group stage. In 2002 UNAM participated in the Pre Libertadores trying to earn a spot in the 2003 edition of the tournament.

Group stage

Knockout phase

Round of 16

Quarterfinals

Statistics

Appearances and goals

Goalscorers

Hat-tricks

Own goals

Notes

A.  Andrés Chitiva was loaned to Cruz Azul to participate in the knockout stage of the Copa Libertadores.
B.  Guadalajara finished the regular phase of the tournament ahead of Cruz Azul; therefore, Guadalajara advances to the playoffs.

References

Mexican football clubs 2002–03 season
Cruz Azul seasons